Montana Province (transliterated: Oblast Montana) is a province in northwestern Bulgaria, bordering Serbia in the southwest and Romania in the north. It spreads its area between the Danube river and the Balkan Mountains. It was named after its administrative centre the city of Montana.

Municipalities

The Montana province (Област, oblast) contains 11 municipalities (singular: община, obshtina - plural: Общини, obshtini). The following table shows the names of each municipality in English and in Cyrillic, the main town (in bold) or village, and the population as of 2011.

Demographics

The following table represents the change of the population in the province after World War II:

Ethnic groups

Total population (2011 census): 148 098

Ethnic groups (2011 census):
Identified themselves: 143 467 persons:
Bulgarians: 123 820 (86,31%)
Romani:   18 228 (12,71%)
Others and indefinable: 1 248 (0,87%)

In the 2001 census, 181,175 people of the population of 182,258 of Montana Province identified themselves as belonging to one of the following ethnic groups (with percentage of total population):

Language
In the 2001 census, 181,208 people of the population of 182,258 of Montana Province identified one of the following as their mother tongue (with percentage of total population): 
160,494 Bulgarian, 
19,849 Romani, 
220 Turkish, 
and 645 other.

Religion

In the 2011 census, 136,175 people of the population of 148,098 of Montana Province identified one of the following as their religion:

In the 2001 census, 172,358 people of the population of 182,258 of Montana Province identified one of the following as their religion:

Towns and villages 
The place names in bold have the status of town (in Bulgarian: град, transliterated as grad). Other localities have the status of village (in Bulgarian: село, transliterated as selo). The names of localities are transliterated in Latin alphabet, followed in parentheses by the original name in Bulgarian Cyrillic alphabet which links to the corresponding Bulgarian Wikipedia article).

Berkovitsa (Берковица) 
The Berkovitsa municipality has one town (in bold) and 19 villages:

 Balyuvitsa (Балювица)
 Barzia (Бързия)
 Berkovitsa (Берковица)
 Bistrilitsa (Бистрилица)
 Bokilovtsi (Бокиловци)
 Borovtsi (Боровци)
 Gaganitsa (Гаганица)
 Komarevo (Комарево)
 Kostentsi (Костенци)
 Kotenovtsi (Котеновци)
 Leskovets (Лесковец)
 Mezdreya (Мездрея)
 Parlichevo (Пърличево)
 Pesochnitsa (Песочница)
 Rashovitsa (Рашовица)
 Slatina (Слатина)
 Chereshovitsa (Черешовица)
 Tsvetkova bara (Цветкова бара)
 Yagodovo (Ягодово)
 Zamfirovo (Замфирово)

Boychinovtsi (Бойчиновци) 
The Boychinovtsi municipality has one town (in bold) and 12 villages:

 Beli breg (Бели брег)
 Beli brod (Бели брод)
 Boychinovtsi (Бойчиновци)
 Erden (Ерден)
 Gromshin (Громшин)
 Kobilyak (Кобиляк)
 Lehchevo (Лехчево)
 Madan (Мадан)
 Marchevo (Мърчево)
 Ohrid (Охрид)
 Palilula (Палилула)
 Portitovtsi (Портитовци)
 Vladimirovo (Владимирово)

Brusartsi (Брусарци) 
The Brusartsi municipality has one town (in bold) and nine villages:

 Bukovets (Буковец)
 Brusartsi (Брусарци)
 Dabova mahala (Дъбова махала)
 Dondukovo (Дондуково)
 Kiselevo (Киселево)
 Knyazheva mahala (Княжева махала)
 Kriva bara (Крива бара)
 Odorovtsi (Одоровци)
 Smirnenski (Смирненски)
 Vasilovtsi (Василовци)

Chiprovtsi (Чипровци) 
The Chiprovtsi municipality has one town (in bold) and nine villages:

 Belimel (Белимел)
 Chelyustnitsa (Челюстница)
 Chiprovtsi (Чипровци)
 Gorna Kovachitsa (Горна Ковачица)
 Gorna Luka (Горна Лука)
 Martinovo (Мартиново)
 Mitrovtsi (Митровци)
 Prevala (Превала)
 Ravna (Равна)
 Zhelezna (Железна)

Georgi Damyanovo (Георги Дамяново) 
The Georgi Damyanovo municipality has 13 villages:

 Chemish (Чемиш)
 Dalgi del (Дълги дел)
 Diva Slatina (Дива Слатина)
 Elovitsa (Еловица)
 Gavril Genovo (Гаврил Геново)
 Georgi Damyanovo (Георги Дамяново)
 Glavanovtsi (Главановци)
 Govezhda (Говежда)
 Kamenna Riksa (Каменна Рикса)
 Kopilovtsi (Копиловци)
 Melyane (Меляне)
 Pomezhdin (Помеждин)
 Vidlitsa (Видлица)

Lom (Лом) 
The Lom municipality has one town (in bold) and nine villages:

 Dobri dol (Добри дол)
 Dolno Linevo (Долно Линево)
 Kovachitsa (Ковачица)
 Lom (Лом)
 Orsoya (Орсоя)
 Slivata (Сливата)
 Staliyska mahala (Сталийска махала)
 Stanevo (Станево)
 Traykovo (Трайково)
 Zamfir (Замфир)

Medkovets (Медковец) 
The Medkovets municipality has five villages:

 Asparuhovo (Аспарухово)
 Medkovets (Медковец)
 Pishurka (Пишурка)
 Rasovo (Расово)
 Slivovik (Сливовик)

Montana (Монтана) 
The Montana municipality has one town (in bold) and 23 villages:

 Belotintsi (Белотинци)
 Bezdenitsa (Безденица)
 Blagovo (Благово)
 Doktor Yosifovo (Доктор Йосифово)
 Dolna Riksa (Долна Рикса)
 Dolna Verenitsa (Долна Вереница)
 Dolno Belotintsi (Долно Белотинци)
 Gabrovnitsa (Габровница)
 Gorna Verenitsa (Горна Вереница)
 Gorno Tserovene (Горно Церовене)
 Klisuritsa (Клисурица)
 Krapchene (Крапчене)
 Lipen (Липен)
 Montana (Монтана)
 Nikolovo (Николово)
 Slavotin (Славотин)
 Smolyanovtsi (Смоляновци)
 Stubel (Стубел)
 Studeno buche (Студено буче)
 Sumer (Сумер)
 Trifonovo (Трифоново)
 Vinište (Винище)
 Virove (Вирове)
 Voynitsi (Войници)

Valchedram (Вълчедръм) 
The Valchedram municipality has one town (in bold) and ten villages:

 Botevo (Ботево)
 Buzovets (Бъзовец)
 Cherni vrakh (Черни връх)
 Dolni Tsibar (Долни Цибър)
 Gorni Tsibar (Горни Цибър)
 Ignatovo (Игнатово)
 Mokresh (Мокреш)
 Razgrad (Разград)
 Septemvriytsi (Септемврийци)
 Valchedram (Вълчедръм)
 Zlatiya (Златия)

Varshets (Вършец) 

The Varshets municipality has one town (in bold), eight villages and one monastery (which has official status as a locality):

 Cherkaski (Черкаски)
 Dolna Bela Rechka (Долна Бела речка)
 Dolno Ozirovo (Долно Озирово)
 Draganitsa (Драганица)
 Klisurski Monastery (Клисурски манастир)
 Gorna Bela Rechka (Горна Бела речка)
 Gorno Ozirovo (Горно Озирово)
 Spanchevtsi (Спанчевци)
 Stoyanovo (Стояново)
 Varshets (Вършец)

Yakimovo (Якимово) 
The Yakimovo municipality has four villages:

 Dalgodeltsi (Дългоделци)
 Dolno Tserovene (Долно Церовене)
 Komoshtitsa (Комощица)
 Yakimovo (Якимово)

See also
Provinces of Bulgaria
Municipalities of Bulgaria
List of cities and towns in Bulgaria
List of towns and villages in Montana Province

References

External links

Information and map

 
Provinces of Bulgaria